George Granville Monah James (November 9, 1893 – June 30, 1956) was a Guyanese-American historian and author, known for his 1954 book Stolen Legacy, which argues that Greek philosophy and religion originated in ancient Egypt.

Biography
James was born in Georgetown, Guyana. His parents were Reverend Linch B. and Margaret E. James. James earned bachelor's and master's degrees at Durham University in England and gained his doctorate at Columbia University in New York. He was Professor of Logic and Greek at Livingstone College in Salisbury, North Carolina, before working at Arkansas AM&N College in Pine Bluff, Arkansas. James died two years after publishing Stolen Legacy in 1954. James was a freemason and was associated with Prince Hall Freemasonry.

Stolen Legacy
James was the author of the widely circulated Stolen Legacy: The Greeks Were Not the Authors of Greek Philosophy, But the People of North Africa, Commonly Called the Egyptians (also known as Stolen Legacy: Greek Philosophy is Stolen Egyptian Philosophy), first published in 1954.

In this book, James claims that, among other things, the ancient Greeks were not the original authors of Greek philosophy, which he argues was mainly based on ideas and concepts that were borrowed without acknowledgement, or indeed stolen, from the ancient Egyptians. He argues that Alexander the Great "invaded Egypt and captured the Royal Library at Alexandria and plundered it", that Aristotle's ideas came from these stolen books and that he established his school within the library. The book draws on the writings of freemasonry to support its claim that the Greco-Roman mysteries originate from an "Egyptian Mystery System", although as historians point out, James doesn't cite these sources accurately.

James invokes Ancient Greek sources such as Herodotus who describe the cultural debt of Greece to Egypt. He also mentions prominent Greek philosophers such as Pythagoras and Plato who are said to have studied in Egypt. He attributes Democritus's use of the term atom (indivisible particle) to the Egyptian deity Atum, who symbolizes completeness and indivisibility.

Responses 
Stolen Legacy and its thesis have been controversial since the book was published. The book received positive responses by Afrocentrist authors but it was sharply criticized by historians and other scholars.

Afrocentrist author William Leo Hansberry wrote in support of the book's key premises, including its conclusion that the Greeks stole the knowledge of the Egyptians.

Philosopher Ronald B. Levinson dismissed the book in a 1955 review, writing that "only social psychologists and collectors of paradoxes will find here grist for their mills" and presenting some of James's claims as self-evidently ridiculous. Historian Stephen Howe wrote that the book "is a work of utmost intellectual naivety, innocent of even the outward appearances of academic procedure". 

Historians Wilson J. Moses, Albert Gelpi, Mary Lefkowitz, Ronald H. Fritze and philosopher Robert Todd Carroll all call the book and its claims pseudohistorical. Carroll writes that:

James's principal sources were Masonic, especially The Ancient Mysteries and Modern Masonry (1909) by the Rev. Charles H. Vail. The Masons in turn derived their misconceptions about Egyptian mystery and initiation rites from the eighteenth century work of fiction Sethos [...] (1731) by the Abbe Jean Terrasson (1670-1750), a professor of Greek. Terrasson had no access to Egyptian sources and he would be long dead before Egyptian hieroglyphics could be deciphered. But Terrasson knew the Greek and Latin writers well. So he constructed an imaginary Egyptian religion based upon sources which described Greek and Latin rites as if they were Egyptian [...] Hence one of the main sources for Afrocentric Egyptology turns out to be Greece and Rome. The Greeks would have called this irony. I don't know what Afrocentrists call it.

Professor of philosophy Ulstad Karin, reviewing the book in the academic journal Kritike, states that it isn't a genuine work of scholarship, but rather "a plea for justice and reformation, a call to turn the tide of racism washing over his time". He writes that:

Stolen Legacy has strongly influenced the Afrocentric school of history, including leading exponents such as Asa Hillaird, Yosef Ben-Jochannan and Molefi Kete Asante.

Lefkowitz–Bernal arguments 

In the 1990s, classics professor Mary Lefkowitz emerged as a prominent critic of Afrocentrism and of James. Her critique of Stolen Legacy showed that the book tries to look scholarly but is ultimately a pseudohistory which is disingenuous and extremely tendentious in its conclusions. Lefkowitz makes the following arguments:
 Ancient Egypt was racially mixed (and therefore its cultural legacy does not represent an inherently "black" or "African" contribution).
 Stolen Legacy is unscholarly, relying heavily on repetition of claims about Alexander's "theft" of Egyptian material, and lacking precise footnoting.
 Alexandria was founded after Alexander's conquest of Egypt and never integrated into Egyptian society, and the Library of Alexandria was built still later; therefore, it contained no repository of Egyptian culture for the immigrant Greeks to steal.
 James misrepresents his masonic sources, who in discussing the "Egyptian mysteries" actually mean Greco-Roman mysteries operating in Egypt, and cites other outdated sources on Egypt which do not take modern scholarship into account. ("Thus most ironically," she writes, "the 'Egyptian Mystery System' described by James is not African, but essentially Greek, and in its details, specifically European.")
 The Egyptian writings (notably the Hermetic Corpus) that James presents as predecessors to Greek philosophy were composed in the Hellenistic period.
 Similarities found by ancient writers between Greek and Egyptian deities do not imply Egyptian origin. Egyptian philosophy does not include a doctrine of transmigration of souls. Other purported connections in mathematics, science, and philosophy are also insubstantial.
 The great philosophers Socrates and Aristotle are not said to have traveled to Egypt.

Martin Bernal, author of the Black Athena trilogy which presents arguments similar to Stolen Legacy, in turn criticized Lefkowitz for poor sourcing, double standards for evidence, and omission of key details. Bernal points to modern scholarship indicating pre-Hellenistic origins of the Hermetic Corpus. Bernal argues that archaeological data, as well as Greek and Latin sources, demonstrate a diffusion of the cult of Isis, mystery religion, and initiation ceremonies from Egypt to Greece. Finally, Bernal recapitulates the historiographical argument of Black Athena Volume 1 that the "Ancient Model" of Egyptian influence on Greece was standard until it was eclipsed in the 19th century, for ideological reasons, by the "Aryan Model".

Lefkowitz, replying in the same journal, wrote that Greek philosophy borrowed from Egypt, but neither "borrowed massively" nor "stole", and Greece was influenced by other cultures as well. She responds to his critique of her reading of Diodorus and clarifies other points. She remonstrates that Bernal uses needlessly charged terms such as "attack", "rage", and "Aryan", which distract from the matter at hand.

Italian historian Mario Liverani sides with Lefkowitz and considers Bernal and the Afrocentrists to be far more biased and guilty of falsification than any of the allegedly racist scholars who, Bernal claims, created the Aryan Model of ancient history. Liverani's solution is for scholars "to work without prejudices and hidden agendas".

Bibliography 
 James, George G. M. Stolen Legacy: Greek Philosophy is Stolen Egyptian Philosophy. Philosophical Library, 1954.

Notes

References

External links
 Stolen Legacy editions listed on WorldCat.
 Charles D. Johnson, "An Investigation into the Death of Professor George G. M. James" concerning a claim formerly made on Wikipedia that James died violently shortly after Stolen Legacy was published.

20th-century Guyanese historians
American Prince Hall Freemasons
Alumni of Durham University
Alumni of the University of London
Livingstone College faculty
Columbia University alumni
University of Arkansas at Pine Bluff faculty
Afrocentrists
1893 births
1956 deaths